Vasilissa is a monotypic genus of phasmids belonging to the family Phasmatidae. The only species is Vasilissa walkeri.

The species is found in Northern Australia.

References

Phasmatidae
Insects described in 1896
Insects of Australia